Necrothrips is a fossil genus of thrips in the family Phlaeothripidae.

Species
 †Necrothrips major
 †Necrothrips nanus

References

Phlaeothripidae
Thrips
Thrips genera